Maqueda is a Spanish town located 80 kilometers from Madrid and 45 kilometers from Toledo. Located within the autonomous community Castilla-La Mancha and the province of Toledo, Maqueda is located in the comarca of Torrijos. The town is best known for its remarkably well-preserved castle, the Castillo de la Vela.

Etymology 
The name "Maqueda" comes from the root mkd and the Arabic term Maqqada, which means "stable", "firm", or "solid". Other experts believe that the name derives from the root kyd and the Arabic term Makîda, which means "strategically located" or "strong plaza".

The castillo de la vela 
The castillo de la vela, also known as the castillo de Maqueda is located on the outskirts of town. Originally of Moorish design, the castle was rebuilt and expanded during the 15th century. It was eventually appropriated by the state, which established a Guardia Civil post within the castle and provided for its future conservation.

The castle is rectangular in shape and sits on two distinct elevations. The castle's protections include 3.5-meter-thick walls, moats on two sides, and a number of circular towers. The exterior of the castle is free to visit, though visitors are not permitted to enter the castle proper.

The castle was declared an artistic historical monument on 3 June 1931.

References 

Municipalities in the Province of Toledo
Towns in Spain